Epitoxis nigra is a moth of the subfamily Arctiinae. It was described by George Hampson in 1903. It is found in Mozambique, South Africa, Uganda and Zimbabwe.

References

 

Arctiinae
Lepidoptera of Mozambique
Lepidoptera of South Africa
Lepidoptera of Uganda
Lepidoptera of Zimbabwe
Moths of Sub-Saharan Africa
Moths described in 1903